The tetraploid complementation assay is a technique in biology in which cells of two mammalian embryos are combined to form a new embryo. It is used to construct genetically modified organisms, to study the consequences of certain mutations on embryonal development, and in the study of pluripotent stem cells.

Procedure
Normal mammalian somatic cells are diploid: each chromosome (and thus every gene) is present in duplicate (excluding genes from X chromosome absent in Y chromosome). The assay starts with producing a tetraploid cell in which every chromosome exists fourfold. This is done by taking an embryo at the two-cell stage and fusing the two cells by applying an electrical current. The resulting tetraploid cell will continue to divide, and all daughter cells will also be tetraploid.

Such a tetraploid embryo can develop normally to the blastocyst stage and will implant in the wall of the uterus. The tetraploid cells can form the extra-embryonic tissue (placenta, etc.); however, a proper fetus will rarely develop.

In the tetraploid complementation assay, one now combines such a tetraploid embryo (either at the morula or blastocyst stage) with normal diploid embryonic stem cells (ES) from a different organism. The embryo will then develop normally; the fetus is exclusively derived from the ES cell, while the extra-embryonic tissues are exclusively derived from the tetraploid cells.

Applications
 Foreign genes or mutations can be introduced into ES cells rather easily, and these ES cells can then be grown into whole animals using the tetraploid complementation assay.
 By introducing targeted mutations into the tetraploid cells and/or into the ES cells, one can study which genes are important for fetal development and which ones are important for development of the extra-embryonic tissues.
 The tetraploid complementation assay is also used to test whether induced pluripotent stem cells (stem cells artificially produced from differentiated cells, e.g. from skin cells) are as competent as normal embryonal stem cells. If a viable animal can be produced from an induced pluripotent stem cell using the tetraploid complementation assay, then the induced stem cells are deemed equivalent to embryonal stem cells. This was first shown in 2009.

References

Stem cells
Genetic engineering